Noxubee County High School is the only public secondary school in Noxubee County, Mississippi. It is located at 16478 Hwy 45 in Macon, Mississippi.

Its attendance boundary is all of Noxubee County.

Athletics
The Noxubee County High School football and basketball teams compete in District 4A. Their mascot is the tiger. The football team won the 2009 and 2012 State Championship. They repeated as champions in 2014 and 2015.
The Noxubee High School Tigers girls basketball team won back to back state titles in 1993-94.

Demographics
As of the 2015 school year, there were 563 students, 99% (558) of whom were black, 3 of whom were Hispanic, and 2 of whom were white. Of these, 560 were eligible for free lunch. 285 students were male, 278 were female.

Notable people
Buster Barnett, tight end
Darion Conner, NFL linebacker
Omarr Conner, American football quarterback
Freddie Joe Nunn, NFL
Deontae Skinner, NFL linebacker
Jeffery Simmons, NFL DT, Tennessee Titans
Demetries Wells, Free Safety Jackson State

References

External links
 

Public high schools in Mississippi